Lokomotif (or Locomotif) is a Turkish band that represented Turkey (along with Seyyal Taner) in the Eurovision Song Contest 1987 with the song "Şarkım Sevgi Üstüne". They failed to score any points and finished last.

References

Eurovision Song Contest entrants for Turkey
Eurovision Song Contest entrants of 1987